"Christmas Tree" is a song recorded by South Korean singer V of BTS, for the soundtrack of the South Korean television series Our Beloved Summer. It was released on December 24, 2021, by Most Contents.

Track listing 

Digital download/streaming
 "Christmas Tree" – 3:30
 "Christmas Tree" (instrumental) – 3:30

Charts

Weekly charts

Monthly charts

Year-end charts

Release history

References 

2021 singles
2021 songs
South Korean television drama theme songs